The 2011–12 AFC Bournemouth season saw the club compete in League One, the FA Cup, the League Cup and the Football League Trophy. In the league the club finished in 11th place.

Squad statistics

Appearances and goals

|-
|colspan="14"|Players appeared for Bournemouth who have left the club:

|-
|colspan="14"|Players who played on loan for Bournemouth and returned to their parent club:

|}

Top scorers

Disciplinary record

Results

Pre-season friendlies

League One

Result round by round

League table

Results

FA Cup

League Cup

Football League Trophy

Transfers

Awards

References 

AFC Bournemouth seasons
AFC Bournemouth